Maximum Shame is a 2010 dystopian science fiction fantasy film, written and directed by Carlos Atanes and released in September 2010.

Plot
The end of the world is imminent. A man goes into a parallel dimension, a limbo between reality and fantasy where the normal rules of time and space have ceased to apply. His wife goes to rescue him. Both will be trapped in a strange and cruel world where a ruthless Queen organizes reality as a mad game of chess, a post-apocalyptic dystopia of domination and subjugation where  characters can’t eat, speak or move about freely and are periodically viciously attacked.

Notes
Maximum Shame is the third feature movie by Carlos Atanes. It can be framed as the previous ones—FAQ: Frequently Asked Questions and Proxima—within the fantasy genre. Produced completely independently, like all its author's films, it was supposedly inspired by pornographic 70's films. Thereby recovering the underground, transgressive and weird style that characterized Atanes' early work. Shooting, in English, was developed in Spain over just six days, but one scene was made in the UK with British scream queen Eleanor James. The film was a failure upon release.

Cast and roles include
 Ana Mayo
 Marina Gatell
 Ignasi Vidal
 Paco Moreno
 Ariadna Ferrer
 David Castro
 Eleanor James

Awards
 BUT Film Festival 2010: nominated for BEST FEATURE MOVIE, Breda, Netherlands.
 Nominated for WEIRDEST PICTURE of 2011 (Weirdcademy Awards)

Notes

External links 
 
 

2010 films
Films directed by Carlos Atanes
2010s science fiction films
English-language Spanish films
Spanish science fiction films
British science fiction films
British avant-garde and experimental films
Dystopian films
2010s musical films
Dreams
British musical fantasy films
2010s avant-garde and experimental films
2010s English-language films
2010s British films